A zoological society is a group or organization, often a voluntary association, interested in fields of study related to the animal kingdom. These fields generally include zoology, animal physiology, pathology, veterinary medicine, wildlife conservation, conservation biology, and related topics. Zoological societies are often associated with the operation and/or management of zoos, public aquariums, veterinary hospitals, research institutions, and conservation projects, and with the publication of scientific journals and periodicals. The first such society was the Zoological Society of London, founded in 1826.

Zoological society may refer to:

Africa
Zoological Society of Southern Africa, publishing African Zoology

Asia
International Society of Zoological Sciences (founded 2004), based in Beijing, China
Zoological Society of Bangladesh (founded 1972)
Zoological Society of Pakistan (founded 1968)
Malaysian Zoological Society, operating the National Zoo of Malaysia
Zoological Society of Israel, associated with Heinz Steinitz
Zoological Society of Nepal

India
Zoological Society of India (founded 1938), based in Gaya, India; publishing Proceedings of the Zoological Society of India
Zoological Society, Kolkata (founded 1945 as the Zoological Society of Bengal), publishing Proceedings of the Zoological Society
Zoological Society, Madras Christian College, Chennai
Zoological Society of Odisha State

Japan
Fukuoka City Zoological Society (founded 1952), affiliated with the Fukuoka Municipal Zoo and Botanical Garden
Tokyo Zoological Park Society (founded 1948), operating the Ueno Zoo, Tama Zoological Park, Tokyo Sea Life Park, Inokashira Park Zoo, and Ohshima Park Zoo
Zoological Society of Japan (founded 1878 as the Biological Society of Tokyo), publishing Zoological Science

Atlantic islands
Puerto Rico Zoological Society
Bermuda Zoological Society (founded 1978), affiliated with the Bermuda Aquarium, Museum and Zoo
Zoological Society of Trinidad and Tobago, affiliated with the Emperor Valley Zoo

Europe
Société zoologique de France (founded 1876)
Unione Zoologica Italiana (founded 1900), publishing The European Journal of Zoology
Zoological Society of Ireland (founded 1830), operating the Dublin Zoo and Fota Wildlife Park
Koninklijke Maatschappij voor Dierkunde Antwerpen, operating the Antwerp Zoo and Planckendael Zoo
Société impériale zoologique d'acclimatation (founded 1854), affiliated with the Jardin d'Acclimatation
Zoologisch-Botanische Gesellschaft of Vienna (founded 1851 by Georg Ritter von Frauenfeld)
Koninklijke Belgische Vereniging voor Dierkunde vzw - Société Royale Zoologique de Belgique asbl, publishing the diamond open access journalThe Belgian Journal of Zoology

Germany
Frankfurt Zoological Society (founded 1858), operated the Frankfurt Zoological Garden
Deutsche Zoologische Gesellschaf, affiliated with Frontiers in Zoology
Verein Zoologischer Garten München e.V. (founded 1905), affiliated with the Hellabrunn Zoo
Zoologische Gesellschaft für Arten- und Populationsschutz (founded 1982), based in Munich and affiliated with the Angkor Centre for Conservation of Biodiversity
Zoologische Gesellschaft in Hamburg (1860–1920), operated the now-defunct Zoological Garden of Hamburg

Netherlands
Koninklijke Nederlandse Dierkundige Vereniging, publishing Animal Biology
Natura Artis Magistra (founded 1838), a Royal Zoological society in Amsterdam operating the zoo Natura Artis Magistra and, formerly, the now-defunct Ethnographic Museum Artis

United Kingdom
Royal Zoological Society of Scotland (founded 1909), operating the Edinburgh Zoo and Highland Wildlife Park
Zoological Society of London (founded 1826), operating the London Zoo, Whipsnade Zoo, and Institute of Zoology, and publishing the Journal of Zoology
Bristol, Clifton and West of England Zoological Society, affiliated with the Bristol Zoo and Wild Place Project
Dudley and West Midlands Zoological Society (founded 1935), owns and runs Dudley Zoo
Hints Zoological Society (founded 1954) and East Midlands Zoological Society (founded 1972), both founded by Molly Badham and Nathalie Evans
North of England Zoological Society (founded 1934), operating the Chester Zoo
Zoological Society of East Anglia, operating Africa Alive! and the Banham Zoo
Zoological Society of Glasgow and West of Scotland (founded 1936), operated the now-defunct Glasgow Zoo
Zoological Society of Wales (founded 1983), operating the Welsh Mountain Zoo

North America

Canada
Wildlife Conservation Society Canada (founded 2004), Canadian affiliate of the Wildlife Conservation Society
Calgary Zoological Society (founded 1929), operating the Calgary Zoo
Canadian Society of Zoologists, affiliated with the Canadian Journal of Zoology
Kamloops Wildlife Park Society (founded 1965 as the Greater Kamloops Zoological Society), operating the British Columbia Wildlife Park
Saskatoon Zoo Society (founded 1976 as the Saskatoon Regional Zoological Society), affiliated with the Forestry Farm Park and Zoo
Zoological Society of Manitoba (founded 1956), associated with the Assiniboine Park Zoo
Zoological Society of Montreal (founded 1964)

United States

Northeast
Wildlife Conservation Society (founded 1895 as the New York Zoological Society), operating the Bronx Zoo, Central Park Zoo, New York Aquarium, Prospect Park Zoo, and Queens Zoo
Boston Zoological Society, affiliated with the Franklin Park Zoo
Buttonwood Park Zoological Society (founded 1969), affiliated with the Buttonwood Park Zoo
Cape May County Zoological Society/ZooFriends (founded 1986), associated with the Cape May County Park & Zoo
Erie Zoological Society (founded 1962), operating the Erie Zoo
Staten Island Zoological Society (founded 1933), operating the Staten Island Zoo
Zoological Society of Philadelphia (founded 1859), affiliated with the Philadelphia Zoo

Midwest
Chicago Zoological Society (founded 1921), operating the Brookfield Zoo
Detroit Zoological Society (founded 1911), operating the Detroit Zoo
Fort Wayne Zoological Society (founded 1966), operating the Fort Wayne Children's Zoo
Greater Minot Zoological Society (founded 1970), operating the Roosevelt Park Zoo
Henry Vilas Park Zoological Society (founded 1914 as the Madison Zoological and Aquarium Society), associated with the Henry Vilas Zoo
Indianapolis Zoological Society (founded 1944), operating the Indianapolis Zoo
John Ball Zoological Society (founded 1949), affiliated with the John Ball Zoological Garden
Lake Area Zoological Society (founded 1972), affiliated with the Bramble Park Zoo
Lincoln Park Zoological Society (founded 1961), operating the Lincoln Park Zoo
Potawatomi Zoological Society, operating the Potawatomi Zoo
Potter Park Zoological Society (founded 1969 as the Friends of the Zoo Society), affiliated with the Potter Park Zoo
Red River Zoological Society (founded 1993), operating the Red River Zoo
Sedgwick County Zoological Society, associated with the Sedgwick County Zoo
Toledo Zoological Society, operating the Toledo Zoo
Zoological Society of Cincinnati (founded 1873), operating the Cincinnati Zoo and Botanical Garden
Zoological Society of Milwaukee (founded 1910), affiliated with the Milwaukee County Zoo
Zoological Society of St. Louis (founded 1910), affiliated with the Saint Louis Zoo

South
Society for Integrative and Comparative Biology (founded 1902 as the American Society of Zoologists); based in McLean, Virginia; publishing Integrative and Comparative Biology (formerly titled American Zoologist) and Physiological and Biochemical Zoology
Abilene Zoological Society, affiliated with the Abilene Zoological Gardens
Alabama Zoological Society (founded 1971), affiliated with the Birmingham Zoo
Baltimore City Zoological Society, affiliated with The Maryland Zoo in Baltimore
Blue Ridge Zoological Society, operating the Mill Mountain Zoo
Dallas Zoological Society (founded 1955), operating the Dallas Zoo
Delaware Zoological Society (founded 1950), associated with the Brandywine Zoo
Delmarva Zoological Society, affiliated with the Salisbury Zoo
Fort Worth Zoological Association (founded 1939 as the Fort Worth Zoological Society), operating the Fort Worth Zoo
Jacksonville Zoological Society (founded 1971), operating the Jacksonville Zoo and Gardens
Lowry Park Zoological Society of Tampa (founded 1982 as the Lowry Park Zoo Association), operating the Lowry Park Zoo
Maryland Zoological Society (founded 1974), affiliated with The Maryland Zoo in Baltimore
Montgomery Area Zoological Society/Zoo Friends (founded 1976 as the Dixieland Zoological Society), affiliated with the Montgomery Zoo
North Carolina Zoological Society (founded 1968), affiliated with the North Carolina Zoo
Oklahoma Zoological Society/ZooFriends (founded 1954), affiliated with the Oklahoma City Zoo and Botanical Garden
Zoological Society of the Palm Beaches (founded 1969), operating the Palm Beach Zoo
Virginia Zoological Society (founded 1974 as Friends of the Zoo), affiliated with the Virginia Zoological Park

West
Denver Zoological Society, affiliated with the Denver Zoo
Fresno Zoological Society (1949–2006), affiliated with the Fresno Chaffee Zoo
Portland Zoological Society, operated the Oregon Zoo
Pueblo Zoological Society, operating the Pueblo Zoo
Sacramento Zoological Society (founded 1958), operating the Sacramento Zoo
San Francisco Zoological Society (founded 1954), operating the San Francisco Zoo
Zoological Society of San Diego (founded 1916), doing business as San Diego Zoo Wildlife Alliance since 2021; operating the San Diego Zoo, San Diego Zoo Safari Park, San Diego Zoo Institute for Conservation Research, and San Diego Zoo Global Wildlife Conservancy

Oceania

Australia
Royal Zoological Society of New South Wales (founded 1879)
Taronga Conservation Society (founded 1973), operating the Taronga Zoo and Taronga Western Plains Zoo
Royal Zoological and Acclimatization Society of Victoria (1857–1957; founded as the Zoological Society of Victoria, renamed the Acclimatization Society of Victoria from 1861–70), operated the Melbourne Zoo from 1862–1937
Royal Zoological Society of South Australia (founded 1878 as the South Australian Acclimatization and Zoological Society), doing business as Zoos South Australia; operating the Adelaide Zoo and Monarto Safari Park

New Zealand
Auckland Zoological Society (founded 1929), affiliated with the Auckland Zoo
Otorohanga Zoological Society

References